was a Japanese samurai of the Sengoku period through Azuchi–Momoyama period, who served the Oda clan.

He served Saitō Tatsuoki, and later became a monk after Saitō's defeat in 1567.

References
 An Official Guide to Eastern Asia. Japan Dpt. of Railways—Page 109
 Samurai: The Weapons and Spirit of the Japanese Warrior. Clive Sinclaire

Samurai
Daimyo
1518 births
1602 deaths